Skip the Use is a French band with electro funk, rock and punk influences founded in 2008 with musicians from Ronchin, near Lille and made up of Mat Bastard (vocals), Yan Stefani (guitar), Nelson Martins (bass) and Enzo Gabert (drums). The band is signed with Polydor and has distribution arrangement with Universal Music.

Career
The five members used to play in punk band Carving. They released their debut eponymous album Skip the Use produced by CALYSTA and NPE. The latter also organized their French tour and other tours in countries such as Canada, Belgium, Germany, Hungary, Lithuania for the promotion of their album recorded in YellowSub studios with Yves Jaget and Manu Guiot member of NPE, and released 5 October 2009. They also took part in a string of music festivals allowing them to gain fame.

In early 2011, they launched a well-followed blog and a single "Give Me Your Life" accompanied by a music video and in October of same year the EP Sound from the Shadow on Polydor with 5 tracks made available on digital download although limited edition CD was made of the EP but available only at live concerts of the band.

In January 2012, they were nominated for 'best live group or artist revelation of the year' at Victoires de la musique. "Ghost" launched at French TV entertainment show Taratata accompanied by a choir. This was a prerelease for their album Can Be Late released on 6 February 2012. A limited edition also offered an 8-track of live renditions during a concert at Paris' Moulin Rouge La Machine venue on 27 October 2011.

In popular culture
The music of "Give Me", a Skip the Use track was used in promoting Noel dernier cri for Canal +
The same song "Give Me" also became the tune for June TV's show Bienvenue dans la Ruche

Members
Mat Bastard - vocals, guitar, keyboards, programming
Yan Stefani - guitar, keyboards, backing vocals
Nelson Martins - bass, backing vocals
Enzo Gabert - drums

Former Members
Jay Gimenez - bass, backing vocals
Lio Raepsaet - keyboards, synthesizers, samples, laptop computer, saxophone, backing vocals
Manamax Catteloin - drums

Discography

Albums
Studio

Live

EPs

Singles

*Did not appear in the official Belgian Ultratop 50 charts, but rather in the bubbling under Ultratip charts. Added 50 position to actual Ultratip position.

References

External links
Official website

French rock music groups
Musical groups from Hauts-de-France
Musical groups established in 2008
Musical quintets